The Curtiss B-2 Condor was a 1920s United States bomber aircraft. It was a descendant of the Martin NBS-1, which was built by the Curtiss Aeroplane and Motor Company for the Glenn L. Martin Company. There were a few differences, such as stronger materials and different engines, but they were relatively minor.

Development
The B-2 was a large fabric-covered biplane aircraft. Its two engines sat in nacelles between the wings, flanking the fuselage. It had a twin set of rudders on a twin tail, a configuration which was becoming obsolete by that time. At the rear of each nacelle was a gunner position. In previous planes, the back-facing gunners had been in the fuselage, but their view there was obstructed. A similar arrangement (using nacelle-mounted gun platforms) was adopted in the competing Keystone XB-1 aircraft.

The XB-2 competed for a United States Army Air Corps production contract with the similar Keystone XB-1, Sikorsky S-37, and Fokker XLB-2. The other three were immediately ruled out, but the Army board appointed to make the contracts was strongly supportive of the smaller Keystone XLB-6, which cost a third as much as the B-2. Furthermore, the B-2 was large for the time and difficult to fit into existing hangars. However, the superior performance of the XB-2 soon wrought a policy change, and in 1928 a production run of 12 was ordered.

One modified B-2, dubbed the B-2A, featured dual controls for both the pilot and the copilot. Previously, the control wheel and the pitch controls could only be handled by one person at a time. This "dual control" setup became standard on all bombers by the 1930s. There was no production line for the B-2A. The B-2 design was also used as a transport.

The B-2 was quickly made obsolete by technological advances of the 1930s, and served only briefly with the Army Air Corps, being removed from service by 1934. Following production of the B-2, Curtiss Aircraft left the bomber business, and concentrated on the Hawk series of pursuit aircraft in the 1930s.

Variants
Model 52 Company designation of the B-2.
XB-2 Prototype.
B-2 Twin-engined heavy bomber biplane. Initial production version; 12 built.
B-2A Redesignation of one B-2 fitted with dual controls.
Model 53 Condor 18 Civil version of the B-2. Six built.

Military operators

US Army Air Corps
7th Bombardment Group, Rockwell Field, California
11th Bomb Squadron - operated 1928-1931

Specifications (B-2)

See also

References

Bibliography
 Bowers, Peter M. Curtiss Aircraft 1907-1947. London: Putnam & Company, 1979. .

External links

 Curtis B-2 Condor page of Joe Baugher, part of his Encyclopedia of American Aircraft
 USAF Museum article on B-2
 

B-02 Condor
Curtiss B-02
Biplanes
Aircraft first flown in 1929
Twin piston-engined tractor aircraft